is a railway station in the city of Higashimatsushima, Miyagi Prefecture, Japan, operated by East Japan Railway Company (JR East).

Lines
Rikuzen-Akai Station is served by the Senseki Line and is located 43.1 kilometers from the starting point of the Senseki Line at Aoba-dōri Station. It is also served by trains of the Senseki-Tōhoku Line.

Station layout
The station has one island platform connected to the station building by a level crossing. The station is staffed.

Platforms

History
Rikuzen-Akai Station opened on November 22, 1928, as a station on the Miyagi Electric Railway. The Miyagi Electric Railway was nationalized on May 1, 1944. The station was absorbed into the JR East network upon the privatization of JNR on April 1, 1987. The station was closed from March 11, 2011 due to damage to the line associated with the 2011 Tōhoku earthquake and tsunami. A new station building was completed in February 2012.

Passenger statistics
In fiscal 2018, the station was used by an average of 629 passengers daily (boarding passengers only).

Surrounding area

 Senseki Hospital
 Miyagi-Akai Post Office

See also
 List of railway stations in Japan

References

External links

 

Stations of East Japan Railway Company
Railway stations in Miyagi Prefecture
Senseki Line
Railway stations in Japan opened in 1928
Higashimatsushima, Miyagi